The Lomena Landscape Sanctuary is a protected area of a state importance between Rukla Eldership, Jonava District Municipality and Palomenė Eldership, Kaišiadorys District Municipality, in central Lithuania. It covers the course of the Lomena river.

The aim of the sanctuary is to protect the valley of the Lomena river, including its boulders, flora and fauna.

References

Protected areas in Jonava District Municipality
Protected areas in Kaišiadorys District Municipality
1997 establishments in Lithuania